Álvaro Marcelo Espinoza Concha (Santiago, March 3, 1974) is a Chilean actor of theater, cinema and television.

Noted for his interventions in telenovelas such as Romané (2000), Pampa Ilusión (2001), Los Pincheira (2004), Ídolos (2004), Los treinta (2005), El Señor de la Querencia (2008), Pacto de sangre (2018) and Amor a la Catalán (2019).

Since 1998 he has been a partner of the actress Catalina Olcay, with whom he had two daughters, Octavia and Alicia Espinoza. He is the brother of the actress Marcela Espinoza. He studied at the theater school of the Pontificia Universidad Católica de Chile.

Filmography

Film

Telenovelas

TV Series

Theatre
 Fuenteovejuna
 El Mercader de Venecia
 No me pidas la luna (1999)
 El misántropo (2019)

References

1974 births
Living people
Chilean male film actors
Chilean male television actors
20th-century Chilean male actors
21st-century Chilean male actors
Male actors from Santiago